The 1994 Ohio Bobcats football team was an American football team that represented Ohio University in the Mid-American Conference (MAC) during the 1994 NCAA Division I-A football season. In their fifth and final season under head coach Tom Lichtenberg, the Bobcats compiled a 0–11 record (0–9 against MAC opponents), finished in last place in the MAC, and were outscored by all opponents by a combined total of 259 to 82.  They played their home games in Peden Stadium in Athens, Ohio.

Schedule

References

Ohio
Ohio Bobcats football seasons
College football winless seasons
Ohio Bobcats football